DeVry Advantage Academy may refer to DeVry University-affiliated high schools in three cities:
 DeVry Advantage Academy in Chicago, Illinois
 DeVry Advantage Academy in Houston, Texas
 DeVry Advantage Academy in Columbus, Ohio